Manilkara longifolia, commonly known as masseranduba, is a species of plant in the family Sapotaceae. It is endemic to Brazil, where it is threatened by habitat loss.

References

External links
 Picture: wood, cross section, as Mimusops longifolia from the Economic Botany Collection of Richard Spruce

longifolia
Plants described in 1844
Endangered plants
Flora of Brazil
Taxonomy articles created by Polbot